Karst Hoogsteen (October 1, 1923 – August 10, 2015) was a Dutch-born American biochemist famous for noting a new base pairing form in DNA, now called Hoogsteen base pairs. These base pairing intercede in the Watson-Crick base pairing, forging a base pair 'triplex'. The Base Pairs use the N7 nitrogen atom as the accepter rather than the N1 as observed in Watson-Crick base pairing. This leads to a twisted, non-linear arrangement.

References

1923 births
2015 deaths
American biochemists
Dutch biochemists
Dutch emigrants to the United States
University of Groningen alumni
Scientists from Groningen (city)